Mike Tannenbaum (born February 14, 1969) is an American football reporter. He served as the executive vice president of football operations for the Miami Dolphins from 2015 to 2018. Prior to that, he served as the general manager for the New York Jets of the National Football League (NFL). He Founded The 33rd Team, which describes itself as a "football Think Tank."

Education
Tannenbaum graduated from Needham High School in Needham, Massachusetts, in 1987. He received a degree in accounting and a minor in sports management from the University of Massachusetts Amherst. He then graduated cum laude from Tulane University Law School, where he earned his certificate in sports law.

Career

Pittsfield Mets
Tannenbaum was an intern for the minor league Pittsfield Mets during the 1991 season.

Cleveland Browns
Tannenbaum worked in the Cleveland Browns' personnel department acting as an assistant under Michael Lombardi.

New Orleans Saints
Tannenbaum worked as an intern in the New Orleans Saints personnel department while he attended law school In 1996, he worked for the team as a player personnel assistant.

New York Jets
Tannenbaum was hired by the New York Jets on February 19, 1997, as the Director of Player Contract Negotiations. Over the years, Tannenbaum served in numerous administrative positions with the team including Senior Vice President of Football Operations and Assistant General Manager.

Tannenbaum succeeded Terry Bradway as the team's general manager in 2006.

Tannenbaum signed a contract extension with the team through 2014; however, following the last game of the 2012 NFL regular season, Jets owner Woody Johnson announced that Tannenbaum would not return for the 2013 season.

Priority Sports

Tannenbaum was hired by Priority Sports and Entertainment, where he oversaw the coaching, broadcasting and front-office for the New York branch. Some notable clients Tannenbaum represented were: Dan Quinn, Steve Kerr, Phil Savage, and Jack Arute. Tannenbaum resigned from Priority Sports in early 2015 to accept a position with the Miami Dolphins.

Miami Dolphins
Tannenbaum was hired by the Dolphins to be the Executive Vice President of Football Operations, starting February 1, 2015, after acting as a consultant for the team during the 2014 NFL season. On December 31, 2018, he was reassigned from his duties without a defined purpose.

ESPN
In April 2019, Tannenbaum joined ESPN as an NFL Front Office Insider.

References

External links
 
 The 33rd Team

1969 births
Living people
National Football League general managers
New York Jets executives
Tulane University Law School alumni
Isenberg School of Management alumni
People from Bernards Township, New Jersey
Sportspeople from New York City
Sportspeople from Somerset County, New Jersey